Damrell is a surname. Notable people with the surname include:

Frank C. Damrell Jr. (born 1938), United States federal judge in the Eastern District of California
John S. Damrell, president of the International Association of Fire Chiefs
William S. Damrell, member of the United States House of Representatives from Massachusetts